Chryseofusus bonaespei is a species of sea snail, a marine gastropod mollusk in the family Fasciolariidae, the spindle snails, the tulip snails and their allies.

Description

Distribution

References

 Thiele J. (1925). Gastropoden der Deutschen Tiefsee-Expedition. II Teil. Wissenschaftliche Ergebnisse der Deutschen Tiefsee-Expedition auf dem Dampfer "Valdivia" 1898–1899. 17(2): 35-382, pls 13-46
 Vermeij G.J. & Snyder M.A. (2018). Proposed genus-level classification of large species of Fusininae (Gastropoda, Fasciolariidae). Basteria. 82(4-6): 57-82

External links
 Barnard K. H. 1959. Contributions to the knowledge of South African marine Mollusca. Part. II. Gastropoda: Prosobranchiata: Rhachiglossa. Annals of the South African Museum, 45: 1-237

bonaespei
Gastropods described in 1959